Harry Betts (September 15, 1922 – July 13, 2012) was an American jazz trombonist.

Background
Born in New York and raised in Fresno, California, he was active as a jazz trombonist and played with Stan Kenton's orchestra in the 1950s. He can be heard on the album Get Happy! (Verve, 1959) by Ella Fitzgerald.

Music
He wrote and orchestrated soundtracks for several films, including A Swingin' Summer (1965), The Big Mouth (1967), A Time for Dying (1969), The Fantastic Plastic Machine (1969), Goodnight, My Love (1972), Black Mama White Mama (1972), Little Cigars (1973) and Nice Dreams (1981).  Music from his score to Black Mama White Mama was used in the 2003 soundtrack for Kill Bill, Volume 1.

Aside from his work in scoring, he was known for his 1962 album, The Jazz Soul of Doctor Kildare. He did numerous arrangements for singer Jack Jones.

Discography

 The Jazz Soul of Dr. Kildare (Ava, 1962)

As sideman
With Elmer Bernstein
 "The Man with the Golden Arm" (Decca, 1956)
With Bobby Darin
 Venice Blue (Capitol) 
With Fred Katz
 Folk Songs for Far Out Folk (Warner Bros., 1958)
With Stan Kenton
 Stan Kenton's Milestones (Capitol, 1943–47 [1950])
 Encores (Capitol, 1947)
 A Presentation of Progressive Jazz (Capitol, 1947)
 Innovations in Modern Music (Capitol, 1950)
 Stan Kenton Presents (Capitol, 1950)
 This Modern World (Capitol, 1953)
 The Kenton Era (Capitol, 1940–54, [1955])
 The Innovations Orchestra (Capitol, 1950–51 [1997])
With Barney Kessel
 Carmen (Contemporary, 1959)
With Shorty Rogers
 Cool and Crazy (RCA Victor, 1953)
 Shorty Rogers Courts the Count (RCA Victor, 1954)
 Jazz Waltz (Reprise, 1962)
With Pete Rugolo
 Introducing Pete Rugolo (Columbia, 1954)
 Adventures in Rhythm (Columbia, 1954)
 Rugolomania (Columbia, 1955)
 Rugolo Plays Kenton (EmArcy, 1958)
 10 Trombones Like 2 Pianos (Mercury, 1960)

References

1922 births
American film score composers
American male film score composers
American jazz trombonists
Male trombonists
Grammy Award winners
American jazz bandleaders
American jazz composers
American male jazz composers
American music arrangers
2012 deaths